Manolis Nikolakakis (born 19 February 1991) is a Greek professional footballer who plays as a right back for Football League club Aspropyrgos.

Career
Nikolakakis started playing in the youth team of Levadiakos in 2010. He signed a professional contract with the club in January 2011 and was promoted to the men's team.  After a six-month spell at Cretan side Episkopi, Nikolakakis moved to AE Larissa on 24 July 2015, signing a 3-year contract with the club. He was released by the club in the summer of 2016 and joined Football League side Trikala. Not gaining substantial playing time with Trikala, Nikolakakis terminated his contract with the club by mutual consent and moved back to Crete, this time joining Gamma Ethniki title contenders Ergotelis in January 2017. He won the Gamma Ethniki Group 4 title with Ergotelis, scoring the first goal in his pro career during a 1−2 away victory over fellow Cretan club AEEK INKA. Following an uncertain period in which the club was speculated to not be able to participate in the Football League due to the departure of its investors, Nikolakakis signed a contract with Swedish Division 1 side Akropolis IF. He spent the first half of the 2017−18 season in Stockholm before returning to Ergotelis in January 2018 to play in the Football League.

Career statistics

Honours
AEL
 Football League: 2015–16

Ergotelis
 Gamma Ethniki: 2016−17

References

External links
Insports profile 

1991 births
Living people
Greek expatriate footballers
Association football defenders
Super League Greece players
Football League (Greece) players
Levadiakos F.C. players
Athlitiki Enosi Larissa F.C. players
Trikala F.C. players
Ergotelis F.C. players
Akropolis IF players
Kallithea F.C. players
Olympiacos Volos F.C. players
Enosi Panaspropyrgiakou Doxas players
Footballers from Athens
Greek footballers